Platyptilia thyellopa is a moth of the family Pterophoridae. It is known from Bolivia, Colombia and Ecuador.

The wingspan is 22–28 mm. Adults are on wing from October to February.

External links

thyellopa
Moths described in 1926